The Evergreen Hotel is a former hotel located in Vancouver, Washington. At the time when it was built, it was the only hotel located between Portland, Oregon and Olympia, Washington. 

The hotel declined and eventually closed in the late 1970s. In 1987, it was converted into retirement housing. Today the building is closed to the public, although still a dominant feature in the historic South Main District in Vancouver.

References

External links
Profile at the Clark County website

Buildings and structures in Vancouver, Washington
Hotels in Washington (state)
National Register of Historic Places in Clark County, Washington